The Stems are a garage punk band formed in Perth, Western Australia in late 1983. They were founded by Dom Mariani in late 1983. The Stems are heavily influenced by 1960s garage rock and 1970s power pop. The band initially broke up in August 1987 and reformed in 2003, releasing a new album in 2007. Although the group disbanded in October 2009, as of 2013 The Stems are an ongoing live concern.

History

1983: Formation
The Stems formed in late 1983 when vocalist/guitarist Dom Mariani, formerly in The Go-Starts, was introduced to Richard Lane. Lane had seen Mariani in the final few gigs of The Go-Starts and had asked him for guitar lessons which developed into the decision was made to form The Stems. A friend, Gary Chambers, was recruited to join on drums, and bass guitarist John Shuttleworth was poached from the Pink Armadillos. In March 1984, the band had their debut gig at the Old Civic Theater in Perth, which was in support of The Saints and The Triffids. Their sound was influenced by 1960s garage acts ranging from the Electric Prunes, The Standells, and The Chocolate Watch Band to The Easybeats. A local Saturday night residency at the Wizbah venue saw throwback covers with a growing list of original songs which developed a cult following for the band. Shuttleworth decided to leave, so a final gig for the band was arranged which drew a large crowd. The success of this gig and freshly written songs caused the band to recruit a new bass player, school friend Julian Matthews.

The Stems played at local venues such as The Wizbah, The Old Melbourne and The Shenton Park Hotel on a regular basis, the group built up a substantial following in Perth, at a time otherwise dominated by cover bands.

1984-1985:Love Will Grow – Rosebud Volume 1

Late in 1984, they recorded three songs at Shelter Studios in Perth: "She's A Monster", "Make You Mine" and a version of "Tears Me in Two." The original plan was for this to be a self-released single with one track as the A-side and the other two as B-sides. A friend of the band who wanted to help manage them told them he would take the tapes to the east coast and shop them around to the independent labels there. There was quite a bit of interest expressed by a number of labels, but The Stems chose Citadel Records because of the high quality of their releases at the time. In mid-1985, the band went to Sydney to meet up with their new label and promote their first single, "Make You Mine"/"She's A Monster." The Stems first Sydney show was a sold out show with the Painters and Dockers at the Trade Union Club. The tour was perfectly timed with the Sydney inner city scene rediscovering 1960s music and fashion. The group met with an enthusiastic response, which culminated in a full house at the legendary Trade Union Club for their final show. The single reached the top of the independent charts, and also sold 500 copies in England. The single was the second highest selling independent single for Australia in 1985, behind Hoodoo Gurus' "Like Wow - Wipeout!." During this period, they recorded the single "Tears Me in Two" and the Love Will Grow - Rosebud Volume 1 EP, both produced by Rob Younger of the Radio Birdman. The EP reached No. 72 in the national charts, and the band played triumphant shows on their return to Perth.

1986-1987: At First Sight, Violets Are Blue and break-up
The Stems, with new drummer David Shaw on board, spent most of 1986 touring to promote their EP. This included national tours supporting Flamin' Groovies and the Hoodoo Gurus. They also sought a label deal. Mushroom Records signed the band, and The Stems booked into Platinum Studios with producer Alan Thorne at the end of 1986. The recording process didn’t go smoothly, and stretched from the planned one month to three, with a new producer brought in to complete the record. At First Sight, Violets Are Blue was released in 1987, their first recording for The White Label. The album debuted at No. 1 on the Australian alternative charts and 34 on the mainstream charts. It also received national and international critical acclaim and would be one of the best selling Australian albums of that year, despite the lack of commercial airplay in the corporate FM dominated 1980s. Leaning toward a stronger pop sensibility, the album highlighted the talents of Dom Mariani and Richard Lane as skilled tunesmiths of the guitar pop genre. The album was nominated in the top 100 Australian albums of all time by Rolling Stone magazine. In 1987 also saw the band embark on another national tour and make appearances on national television, including playing the final episode of Countdown. In the same year, the lead single "At First Sight" also made the Young Einstein soundtrack. By the October 1987, on the eve of a six-week European tour, the band disbanded. Dom's explanation was:

"I was not very happy with the way things were going towards the end of The Stems. We got quite big, and there are the usual problems that happen with that. People tend to drift apart, there are internal conflicts, egos going wild, and bad management was probably the major factor that contributed to The Stems breakup."

Matthews offered a similar explanation: "In the end it was total burnout. By the time the band broke up, all of us had had enough. Any of us could have quit at any time. There was also this pull to do other stuff away from the band."

The Stems had performed at their last live show on 31 August 1987, but the breakup wasn't officially announced until November 1987. The Stems had released a total of five singles, one EP, and one studio album.

2003-2009: Reunited Heads Up and second break-up 
In March 2003, The Stems reunited for a national tour of the local and international music scene. Following the re-release of their album At First Sight, Violets Are Blue and the release of the Mushroom Soup: The Citadel Years in 2003, The Stems found themselves playing to packed houses across the country, touring Europe, playing the prestigious "Little Stevens Underground Garage Festival" in August 2005, and then at the "Come Together Festival" at Sydney's Luna Park with the cream of Australia's newest bands in September 2005.

2006 saw the release of another anthology titled Terminal Cool in the United States by the garage rock and punk label Get Hip Records. The new anthology includes three previously unreleased tracks including the title track, "Think Cool" from their early live sets. Two of the band's tracks were included in the recent Rhino Nuggets Box set Children of Nuggets which compiles and documents the Paisley Underground and garage rock of the 1980s.

In 2007 The Stems undertook a national tour alongside Hoodoo Gurus and Radio Birdman and released their second album, Heads Up on Shock Records. The album contained ten original garage rock tracks. It was recorded in Perth early in 2007 at the analogue and vintage recording compound Kingdom Studios and later mixed at Ultrasuede in Cincinnati by producer John Curley (White Stripes, Afghan Wigs, Greenhornes and Ronnie Spector). The Stems then toured nationally to promote the new album and played their first shows outside Australia, including European dates and a U.S. visit that included the South by Southwest festival in Austin, Texas.

In July 2009 The Stems announced that they would be disbanding later that year, with an eight-date national farewell tour in October.

2013-present: Second reformation
In April 2013 The Stems performed at Dig It Up! festival shows in Sydney and Melbourne. The lineup was Mariani, Matthews, Shaw and new guitarist Ashley Naylor in place of Lane. The same lineup played gigs on the east coast in March 2014, including supports for the reunited Sunnyboys in Brisbane and Sydney. On 31 May 2014, The Stems was one the headline acts at Perth's annual 'State of the Art' festival at the Perth Cultural Centre.

Members
Dom Mariani – vocals, guitar (1983–1987, 2003–2009, 2013-present)
Richard Lane – vocals, guitar, keyboards, harmonica (1983–1987, 2003–2009) (died May 2020)
Gary Chambers – drums (1983–1986)
Julian Matthews – bass guitar, vocals (1984–1987, 2003–2009, 2013-present)
David Shaw – drums, percussion, vocals (1986–1987, 2003–2009, 2013-present)
John Shuttleworth – bass guitar (1984)
Ashley Naylor; guitar, vocals (2013–present)
Davey Lane; guitar, vocals, keys, harmonica (2017–present)

Discography

Studio albums

Live albums

Compilation albums

Extended plays

Singles

Awards

West Australian Music Industry Awards
The West Australian Music Industry Awards are annual awards celebrating achievements for Western Australian music. They commenced in 1985.

|-
| 2018 || The Stems || Hall of Fame || 
|-

References

External links
 Official website
 "The Stems" archived from the original at Australian Rock Database on 16 July 2012. Retrieved 15 June 2020.
"Interview with Dom Mariani" on Trilogy Rock (Spain)

Australian alternative rock groups
Musical groups established in 1983
Musical groups disestablished in 1987
Musical groups reestablished in 2003
Musical groups disestablished in 2009
Musical groups reestablished in 2013
Musical groups from Perth, Western Australia
Punk blues musical groups
Swamp rock groups
Australian power pop groups